Odafa Onyeka Okolie (born 6 June 1985) is a Nigerian former professional footballer who spent most of his career in India. He last played for Gokulam Kerala in the I-League. He was once the highest paid footballer in I-league history, earning approximately ₹16 million per year in 2011 while playing for Mohun Bagan. Odafa is second in the list of all-time leading goalscorer in the I-League and National Football League history with 179 goals, and has been the top goal scorer on three consecutive seasons.

He also holds the record for scoring the most hat-tricks in I-League and National Football League combined, with 14 hat-tricks across all seasons, including 13 of those in the I-League.

Career

Early career
Okolie started his career in 2002 as a defender with Kolkata based clubs Peerless SC and Mohammedan.

Churchill Brothers
After a lackluster start to his career which saw him play for Indian club Mohammedan, and Bangladeshi club Muktijoddha SKC where he scored 34 goals from 28 appearances. In 2005, Okolie went back to India and signed for Churchill Brothers as a striker. He debuted for the club in 2005–06 National Football League Second Division and scored 4 goals, which helped the club getting promoted to the National Football League. 2006–07 National Football League was break out season for him, as he scored 18 goals and became the top scorer of the league. Okolie was the top scorer in newly formed I-League in two consecutive seasons and won the league in 2008–09. He scored record 113 top division league goals for the club.

Mohun Bagan
On 1 June 2011, he signed a then record one-year deal with Mohun Bagan for approximately $600,000. On 23 October 2011, Odafa scored a hat-trick in his debut for Bagan in a 3–1 victory over Pailan Arrows.

Return to Churchill Brothers and loan to Sporting Goa
On 13 May 2014, Okolie re-joined Churchill Brothers, but later in March 2015, he joined Sporting Goa on a loan deal after Churchill brothers were excluded from the I-League. He helped the club narrowly avoid relegation and was subsequently retained for another season.

Southern Samity
In March 2017, Okolie Joined I-League 2nd Division club Southern Samity. He scored 9 goals in the 2016–17 I-League 2nd Division and became the top scorer.

Gokulam Kerala
In January 2018, Okolie joined I-League club Gokulam Kerala.

Career statistics

Honours
Churchill Brothers
I-League: 2008–09; runner-up 2007–08
Durand Cup: 2007, 2009
IFA Shield: 2009

Muktijoddha SKC
Federation Cup (Bangladesh) runner-up: 2005

Individual
 National Football League (India) Golden Boot: 2006–07 (18 goals)
I-League top scorer: 2007–08, 2008–09, 2009–10

References

Bibliography

External links

Odafa Onyeka Okolie at GSA (archived)

1985 births
Living people
Nigerian footballers
Expatriate footballers in India
Nigerian expatriate sportspeople in India
Churchill Brothers FC Goa players
Expatriate footballers in Bangladesh
I-League players
Mohun Bagan AC players
Sporting Clube de Goa players
Muktijoddha Sangsad KC players
Nigerian expatriate footballers
Association football forwards
Calcutta Football League players